Lemprière is both a surname and a given name originating in Jersey. Notable people with the name include:

Clement Lemprière (1683–1746), artist, military draughtsman and cartographer
 Helen Lempriere (1907–1991), Australian artist
 John Lemprière (circa 1765–1824), English classical scholar, lexicographer, theologian, teacher and headmaster
 Cyril Lemprière, English rugby league footballer who played in the 1890s and 1900s, for Yorkshire, and Hull
 Major-General Arthur Reid Lempriere (1835–1927), British soldier and surveyor
 Geoffrey Lemprière (1904–1977), Australian woolbuyer

Given name
 Lemprière Durell Hammond (1881–1965), Anglican bishop